Trichura cyanea is a moth in the subfamily Arctiinae. It was described by Schaus in 1872. It is found in Rio de Janeiro, Brazil.

References

Moths described in 1872
Arctiini